The Banque de Paris et des Pays-Bas (“Bank of Paris and the Netherlands”), generally referred to from 1982 as Paribas, was a French investment bank based in Paris. In May 2000, it merged with the Banque Nationale de Paris to form BNP Paribas.

History

Background

In the early 1820s, Louis-Raphaël Bischoffsheim founded a private banking establishment in Amsterdam in his own name. His brother Jonathan-Raphaël created a branch in Antwerp in 1827 before settling in Brussels in 1836. Having married Henriette Goldschmidt, the daughter of Frankfurt banker Hayum-Salomon Goldschmidt, Louis-Raphaël Bischoffsheim established the Bischoffsheim, Goldschmidt & Cie bank in Paris in 1846, then in London in 1860.

Creation and initial growth

The two banks, Banque de Crédit et de Dépôt des Pays-Bas and Banque de Paris, merged on January 27, 1872 to form the Banque de Paris et des Pays-Bas.

During its first year of existence, the new bank joined forces with Crédit Lyonnais to head the financial consortium set up to float one-third of the Franco-Prussian War indemnity loan of 3 billion francs for the French government.  The major part of the funds raised by Banque de Paris et des Pays-Bas came through its Brussels outlet as a result of the close relations established with certain German financiers.

During that period it led or participated in major government loans, and in share or bond issues for French and foreign private companies. Most noteworthy among these were:
government loans for France, Belgium and their respective colonial empires;
public loan issues in France or Imperial Russia (from 1888 onwards);
issues for the Balkan states (often in association with German banks), for the Scandinavian countries and for Morocco, with the creation of the Moroccan Debt Administration in 1904;
issues in the 1880s and 1900s for Latin America (frequently in association with British houses such as Barings Bank).

Developments in the 20th century

During World War I it helped the French government raise funds through war loans, the 'Bons de la Défense Nationale', and it played its part in negotiations to open credit accounts for the French Treasury in Spain, the Netherlands, Switzerland and Sweden. It also helped to raise finance for the weapons industry (Compagnie Nationale de Matières Colorantes et de Produits Chimiques).

The impact of inflation during the 1920s, combined with the reconstruction effort and moves to expand the bank's activities under the guidance of Horace Finaly (at the head of the bank from 1919 to 1937) led to an increase in the banks capital and further investment in industrial concerns and public utilities.

World War II  eroded its capital and the bank was cut off from its affiliates and correspondent banking partners in the allied countries.  It lost a portion of its foreign assets in Central Europe and Norway. Nevertheless, it helped in the development of industrial patents for such products as alternative fuels, gas producing substances and oil-shale.

Its merchant-banking profile had enabled it to sidestep nationalization in 1945 and Paribas was able to take full advantage of the legislation of 2 December 1945 and 17 May 1946, which ratified the status of a full-service bank. The bank was thus poised to develop its activities freely in commercial banking for French companies and, before long, on an international scale.

The 1960s to 1980 saw Paribas start an investment bank in New York which it expanded into an internal banking network with offices in a number of countries and started an asset management services to private and institutional clients.  Claude de Kemoularia was an important executive in the bank during this period. It also directs its activity towards businesses and participates in the development and restructuring of French industry including names such as Bull, CSF, Thomson.

The bank was nationalized in 1982 by the government led by Pierre Mauroy under President François Mitterrand, as part of a wave of nationalization that included five major industrial companies, thirty-nine depository banks, and the two investment banks Indosuez and Paribas. That same year, the bank adopted its longstanding telegraph address "Paribas" for its brand and corporate identity. Paribas was re-privatized in January 1987 by the government led by Jacques Chirac.

In 1998, Paribas acquired the French bank  and subsequently renamed itself .

In 1999, Banque Nationale de Paris and Société Générale fought a complex battle on the stock market, with Société Générale bidding for Paribas and BNP bidding for Société Générale and counter-bidding for Paribas. BNP's bid for Société Générale failed, but its bid for Paribas succeeded. As a consequence, the merger of BNP and Paribas was completed one year later, on 22 May 2000, forming BNP Paribas.

Controversies

Oil pre financing 
Historically, Paribas has been actively involved in the financing of oil markets and had strong relations with Standard Oil.  This was one of the reasons that Paribas was chosen in the funding agreement in the Iraq Oil-for-Food Programme.  The technique of oil pre-financing consists of loans secured on future oil revenues.  It was developed in the 1970s by Marc Rich and his commodities brokerage Glencore and has been designated by the UN and the World Bank as a cause of impoverishment of oil producing countries and as one of key phenomena of kleptocracy.

Paribas Luxembourg 
Paribas Luxembourg was closely linked to controversial Iraq business man Nadhmi Auchi.  Links date back to the 1970s with the jointly controlled  Continental Bank of Luxembourg.  In early 1990, Auchi was the largest shareholder in Paribas with 12% share through Auchi's holding company General Mediterranean Holdings or GenMed.  He played a key role in Paribas involvement of the Iraq Oil of Food programme signed by Saddam Hussein and the UN.  Auchi played a major role in the BNP Paribas merger.

Arms sales to Angola 
Judge Philippe Courroye investigated the role played by Banque Paribas in the case of arms sales to Angola in what became known as the Mitterrand–Pasqua affair. Between 1995 and 1997, the bank clearing department, then headed by Alain Bernard, funded $573 million of arms sales between Russia and Angola, according to Judge Courroye's investigations.  Jean-Didier Maille, Alain Bernard's deputy, set up the financing and the two men would have received $30 million in commissions in foreign accounts for their actions.  During Jean-Didier Maille's hearing in the investigation he said "the management was aware Paribas activities ... Alain Bernard ... Everyone knew he was paying commissions ... We called these activities: Special Affairs."  For its part, André Levy-Lang, CEO of Paribas subsidiary Compagnie Bancaire said he was not aware of this case and the fees charged by Alain Bernard and Jean-Didier Maille.

References

Further reading 

 Archival documents of Paribas (annual reports) in Source d'Histoire

External links
 

Defunct banks of France
BNP Paribas
Privatized companies of France
2000 mergers and acquisitions